Patrycja Świerżewska (born 5 March 1996) is a Polish handball player for MKS Zagłębie Lubin and the Polish national team. 

She represented Poland at the 2020 European Women's Handball Championship.

References

1996 births
Living people
Polish female handball players
Sportspeople from Warsaw
Polish expatriate sportspeople in Norway
Expatriate handball players
21st-century Polish women